Sasha Keable (born 27 February 1994) is a British singer and songwriter of Colombian descent from South London, England. In 2013, she collaborated with Disclosure on the single "Voices" and toured with the duo around the UK. In 2014, she supported singer Katy B on her UK tour. She has released two extended plays to date, Black Book (2013) and Lemongrass and Limeleaves (2014). Both were signed to Tinie Tempah's independent record label Disturbing London.

Early life
Keable was raised on Soul and Hip Hop, with some of her main influences being Donny Hathaway, Aretha Franklin, Marvin Gaye and Lauryn Hill. Her eclectic tastes manifest themselves in her songwriting and arrangements, which she describes as constantly evolving. Keable graduated from BRIT School and went to sign with independent label Disturbing London founded by Tinie Tempah.

Career
Keable signed a management deal with Disturbing London and also recently signed a deal with Universal Music subsidiary, Polydor Records. She released her debut EP Black Book in 2013, and has now returned to the studio with songwriter and well-known producer Dev Hynes to focus on her debut album.  
During 2013, she performed at London's Wireless Festival, wrote and featured on DJ Zinc's summer house track "Only for Tonight", and alongside touring with Disclosure she both co-wrote and featured on their track "Voices". On 19 May 2014, Keable released her four-track second EP Lemongrass and Limeleaves.

Discography

Extended plays
 Black Book (2013)
 Lemongrass and Limeleaves (2014)
 Man (2019)
 Intermission (2021)

As featured artist

References

1994 births
Living people
English people of Colombian descent
English women singers
People educated at the BRIT School
Singers from London